Pushkaraj Chirputkar is a Marathi actor and host widely known for his role of 'Ashu' on the Marathi sitcom Dil Dosti Duniyadari, as well as for his role in its sequel, Dil Dosti Dobara. Since then he has appeared in Hindi and Marathi movies, and also on webseries.

Early life 
He grew up in Akurdi. He went to a convent school, St. Ursula's. His interest in being part of co-curricular activities, rather than classroom education, got him interested in acting. He completed his Engineering in Electronics & Telecommunications from Pimpri Chinchwad College of Engineering, Akurdi, during which he used to do practice and perform plays with local theatre groups. His family was also very interested in Marathi cinema and theatre. He started out by mimicking Dilip Prabhavalkar as a child, after watching him on TV.

Career 
Chirputkar became known with the role of the simpleton Ashu (Ashutosh Shivalkar) on the Marathi Sitcom Dil Dosti Duniyadari, which became an instant success. He was also in its reboot sequel, Dil Dosti Dobara. He has also been part of Marathi movies like Baapjanma (2017), Tujha Tu Majha Mi (2017), 1 Te 4 Band (2017) and Mantr (2018). He was seen in the Hindi Movie, Budhiya Singh - Born to Run. He also co-hosted Filmfare Award (Marathi) in 2017, alongside Pushkar Shrotri. He also was the host of Maharshtracha Favorite Dancer in 2018 which aired on Sony Marathi. He also made a cameo appearance in Amazon Prime's Original Show The Family Man (2019). He will be seen in Medium Spicy, a Marathi film which is scheduled to be released in 2020.

He also played a role in BhaDiPa's sketch comedies Aaplya Baapacha Hatel and Aaplya Baapacha Rasta.

Filmography

Films

Television

Environmental activism 
He was the chief guest at Haritamritam, a green initiative on organic terrace gardening by Amrita Yuva Dharm Dhara(AYUDH).

References

External links
 

Marathi actors
Indian male television actors
Living people
Male actors in Marathi cinema
Male actors in Marathi television
1986 births